Daniel Johansen (born 9 July 1998) is a Faroese footballer who plays for FC Fredericia.

International career
He was first called up to the Faroe Islands national football team in September 2020, but did not play on that occasion.

He made his debut on 1 September 2021 in a World Cup qualifier against Israel, a 0–4 home loss. He substituted Klæmint Olsen in the 76th minute.

References

External links
 
 

1998 births
Living people
Faroese footballers
Faroese expatriate footballers
Faroe Islands youth international footballers
Faroe Islands under-21 international footballers
Faroe Islands international footballers
Association football defenders
Havnar Bóltfelag players
FC Fredericia players
Faroe Islands Premier League players
Expatriate men's footballers in Denmark